The 1908 Miami Redskins football team was an American football team that represented Miami University during the 1908 college football season. In its second and final season under head coach Amos Foster, the team compiled a perfect 7–0, shut out six of seven opponents, and outscored all opponents by a combined total of 113 to 10. The team captains were George Booth and T. Rymer.

Schedule

References

Miami
Miami RedHawks football seasons
College football undefeated seasons
Miami Redskins football